Institutional failure may refer to:

Government failure
Market failure